Bang Phrom Subdistrict may refer to:

Bang Phrom Subdistrict, Bangkok
Bang Phrom Subdistrict in Bang Khonthi District, Samut Songkhram Province